Dibutylamine is an amine used as a corrosion inhibitor, in the manufacture of emulsifiers, and as a flotation agent. It is flammable and toxic.

References

Alkylamines
Corrosion inhibitors
Secondary amines
Butyl compounds